Antiphiona is a genus of flowering plants in the daisy family.

 Species
Both known species are endemic to Namibia.
 Antiphiona fragrans (Merxm.) Merxm.	 
 Antiphiona pinnatisecta (S.Moore) Merxm.

References

Asteraceae genera
Inuleae
Flora of Namibia